Enfantasme is a 1978 film co-written and directed by Sergio Gobbi. It is based on the novel Enfantasme by Georges-Jean Arnaud.

Plot

Cast

Production
Enfantasme was director Sergio Gobbi's fourteenth film which he chose to adapt the novel Enfantasme by French writer Georges-Jean Arnaud. Gobbi described the films title as a play on words based on the French words "enfant" for child, "fantasme" (ghost)" and the verb "enfanter" (to conceive a child). Gobbi stated the film could have been "turned into a product of the Exorcist thread, or a paranormal film, Audrey Rose-style. Whereas I don't want to be conditioned or stick to formulas.

Enfantasme was shot in five weeks in the village of Bormio.

Release
Enfantasme was distributed in Italy where it was distributed by Battistelli on 5 November 1978. In Italy, the film grossed a total of 9,157,000 Italian lire domestically. It was released in France asL'enfant de nuit: Les inconnus aux petit pieds on 8 November 1978.

The novel of the film was adapted again for film in 2009 by Jean-Paul Guyon as Sommeil blanc.

Reception
Italian film historian Roberto Curti described the critical reception to the film on its released as "mixed."

References

Footnotes

Sources

External links

Enfantasme at Variety Distribution

1978 films
1978 drama films
French drama films
Italian drama films
Films directed by Sergio Gobbi
Films scored by Stelvio Cipriani
Films based on French novels
1970s French films
1970s Italian films